The following is a timeline of the history of Lexington, Kentucky, United States.

18th century

 1775 – Lexington founded in the Colony of Virginia by Colonel Robert Patterson.
 1776 – Lexington becomes part of the new state of Virginia.
 1780 - Transylvania University founded.
 1782
 May – Town of Lexington established.
 August – Siege of Bryan Station.
 1787 – Kentucky Gazette newspaper begins publication.
 1789
 Lexington Light Infantry organized.
 Transylvania Seminary opens.
 1784 – Mount Zion Church founded.
 1790
 Population: 2,000.
 First African Baptist Church founded (approximate date).
 1792
 Lexington becomes part of the new state of Kentucky.
 Kentucky legislature begins meeting.
 1796
 Episcopal church established.
 Lexington Library founded.
 1797 – Postlethwait's Tavern built.

19th century

 1801 – Walnut Hill Presbyterian Church built.
 1806
 Court House built.
 Sign of the Green Tree tavern in business (approximate date).
 1808 – The Reporter newspaper begins publication.
 1809 – Lexington Jockey Club formed.
 1810 - Population: 4,326.
 1811
 Ashland (Henry Clay estate) established.
 Giron confectionery in business.
 1812 – Juvenile Library organized.
 1814 – Hunt House (residence) built.
 1816 – Usher's Theater built (approximate date).
 1818 – Athenaeum founded.
 1820 - Population: 5,279.
 1821 – Lafayette Seminary established.
 1823 – St. Catherine's Academy for girls established.
 1824 – Eastern Lunatic Asylum established. 
 1826
 Kentucky Association formed.
 Masonic Hall dedicated.
 1830
 Lexington and Ohio Railroad established.
 Population: 6,026.
 1831
 Lexington Observer newspaper begins publication.
 Christians and Disciples of Christ of the Restoration Movement meet at the Hill Street Christian Church on December 31, 1831 to merge the separate movements. Groups that descend from this merger include the Christian Church (Disciples of Christ), Church of Christ, and Christian churches and churches of Christ. The Hill Street Church, which had been founded by Stone in 1816, is now Central Christian Church (Disciples of Christ).
 1832
 Episcopal Burying Ground established.
  Chartered as a city.
 1833 – Cholera epidemic.
 1835 - Frankfort-Lexington railway begins operating.
 1840 - Population: 6,997.
 1844 – Market-house built.
 1845
 Christ Church Episcopal built.
 True American anti-slavery newspaper begins publication.
 1847 – Licking and Lexington Railroad begins operating.
 1848 – Lexington and Frankfort Railroad takes over the former Lexington & Ohio.
 1849
 Lexington Cemetery established.
 Covington and Lexington Railroad begins operating.
 1850
 Lexington and Danville Railroad begins operating.
 Maysville and Lexington Railroad begins operating.
 Population: 8,159.
 1854 – Sayre School established.
 1856 – First African Baptist Church built.
 1859 – Kentucky Central railroad begins operating trains to Cincinnati.
 1860 – Lexington and Southern Kentucky Railroad begins operating.
 1861 – August – Union cavalry arrive.
 1863 – Lexington National Cemetery established.
 1865
 College of the Bible established.
 Kentucky Agricultural and Mechanical College established. 
 1867 – Cincinnati, Lexington and East Tennessee Railroad begins operating.
 1869
 Louisville, Cincinnati and Lexington Railroad merges the Lexington and Frankfort Railroad with the Louisville and Frankfort Railroad.
 Elizabethtown, Lexington and Big Sandy Railroad begins operating.
 Hocker Female College established.
 Cemetery of the Union Benevolent Society No. 2 in use.
 1870
 Lexington Herald-Leader|Lexington Daily Press begins publication.
 Odd Fellows Temple built.
 1872 – First Presbyterian Church built.
 1873
 Smith Business College established.
 Trotting Track constructed by Kentucky Trotting Horse Breeders Association.
 1874
 Lexington Railway Company streetcars in operation.
 Population: 13,600.
 1876 – Gordon School for boys established.
 1877 – Saint Joseph Hospital founded.
 1880 - Population: 16,656.
 1882 – Floral Hall built.
 1885 - On July 18, "Woman Triumphant," a marble statue by Joel Tanner Hart portraying a classical nude woman and a Cupid, bought by the Hart's Memorial Association $4,000) and Fayette County ($1,000), was installed in the Fayette County Courthouse
 1886 - State Normal School for Colored Persons founded.
 1887 – 
 Opera House opens.
 John C. Breckinridge Memorial by Edward Valentine, erected on November 24. The 8 foot bronze statue, on 11 foot pedestal of granite was placed in the center of Cheapside Street on the east of the court-house and facing the building. 
 1888 – Kentucky Leader newspaper begins publication.
 1889 - The Kentucky Equal Rights Association meets at the Courthouse in Lexington - its second annual meeting after having been founded in 1888 (during the American Woman Suffrage Association meeting in Cincinnati)
 1892 – Lexington Standard newspaper begins publication.
 1894
 The Fayette Equal Rights Association petitioned the Mayor and City Council to appoint a woman on the school board. Mayor Henry T. Duncan appointed Mrs. Wilbur R. Smith.
 Woman's Club of Central Kentucky organized.
 Central Christian Church built.
1895 - Women (black and white) in Lexington began voting in Lexington Public School Board elections. 2000 women voted in Lexington and four women were elected to the Board of Education.
 1900 – Population: 26,369.

20th century

 1902 - Women's right to vote in school board elections in Lexington, Covington and Newport (Kentucky's second-class cities) was revoked by the Kentucky General Assembly. Lexington's Representative William A. "Billy" Klair and Senator J. Embry Allen introduced and led the campaign to repeal the 1894 partial suffrage statute.  
 1905 – Lexington Public Library opens.
 1907 – Lexington Union Station opens.
 1908 – College of Law, State University of Kentucky established.
 1910 – Population: 35,099.
 1916 – Stoll Field/McLean Stadium opens.
 1920 – Population: 41,534.
 1922 – Kentucky Theater opens.
 1925 – Sesquicentennial.
 1926 – Church of the Good Shepherd dedicated.
 1930 – Population: 45,736.
 1931 – Lexington Veterans Affairs Medical Center established.
 1934
 WLAP radio begins broadcasting.
 United States Post Office and Court House built.
 1935 – United States Narcotic Farm in operation.
 1936 – Keeneland Race Course opens; Ashland Stakes begin.
 1938 – Lexington Children's Theatre founded.
 1946 – F. W. Woolworth Building constructed.
 1949 – Youth Symphony Orchestra active.
 1950
 Ashland (Henry Clay estate) museum opens.
 Memorial Coliseum (University of Kentucky) opens.
 Population: 55,534.
 1951 – John C. Watts becomes U.S. representative for Kentucky's 6th congressional district.
 1955
 WLEX-TV (television) begins broadcasting.
 Blue Grass Trust for Historic Preservation organized.
 1957
 WKYT (television) begins broadcasting.
 Waveland museum opens.
 1958 –  Urban growth boundary enacted.
 1960 – Population: 62,810.
 1961 – Central Kentucky Philharmonic Society formed.
 1969 – Cliff Hagan Stadium opens.
 1970 – Population: 108,137.
 1972
 Blackburn Correctional Complex built.
 Lexington Council of the Arts organized.
 Transit Authority of the Lexington-Fayette Urban County Government established.
 H. Foster Pettit, former state representative, becomes mayor of Lexington.
 1973
 Commonwealth Stadium (Kentucky) opens.
 1974
 City and Fayette County governments consolidated; Lexington-Fayette Urban County Government formed.
  Regional Lexington Area Metropolitan Planning Organization established.
 U.S. Federal Medical Center prison in operation.
 Lexington Ballet Company founded.
 Festival of the Bluegrass begins.
 1975 – Lexington Mall built.
 1976 – Lexington Center and Rupp Arena open.
 1978 – Kentucky Horse Park opens.
 1979 – Kincaid Towers built.
 1980 – Population: 204,165.
 1983 – Lexington Herald-Leader in publication.
 1986 – High Security Unit, U.S. Federal Bureau of Prisons, in operation.
 1987
 Lexington Financial Center built.
 Park Plaza Apartments built.
 1990
 Lexington Children's Museum opens.
 Population: 225,366.
 1991 – Arboretum established.
 1995 – Aviation Museum of Kentucky incorporated.
 1996
 City website online.
 UK Soccer Complex opens.
 1997 - The first shops open in Hamburg Pavilion.
 1998 - William T. Young Library established.
 2000 – Population: 260,512.

21st century

 2001 – Whitaker Bank Ballpark opens.
 2003
 The Dame music hall opens.
 Lexington History Museum opens.
 2004 – Kentucky Horse Park Arboretum established.
 2005 – Bluegrass Community and Technical College established.
 2009
 Boomslang (music festival) begins.
 The Alltech Arena opens.
 Lexington Film League formed.
 2010
 Population: 295,803.
 Lexington becomes the first city outside of Europe to host the World Equestrian Games.
 2011 – Jim Gray becomes mayor.
 The first Harry Dean Stanton film festival held
 2012 - The Town Branch Distillery opens.
 2013
 Andy Barr becomes U.S. representative for Kentucky's 6th congressional district.
 Construction of CentrePointe begins.
 2014 – Redevelopment of the Fayette National Bank Building begins.
 2015 – Keeneland hosted the Breeders' Cup for the first time.
 2017 – The city's newest high school, Frederick Douglass High School, opens.

See also
 Lexington history
 National Register of Historic Places listings in Fayette County, Kentucky
 Timeline of Kentucky history
 Other cities in Kentucky:
 Timeline of Louisville, Kentucky
 Timeline of Newport, Kentucky

References

Bibliography

Published in 19th century

Published in 20th century
 
 
 
 
 
  (fulltext)

Published in 21st century

External links

 Items related to Lexington, Kentucky, various dates (via Digital Public Library of America).
 Items related to Lexington, Kentucky, various dates (via US Library of Congress, Prints & Photos Division)

 
Lexington, Kentucky
lexington
Years in Kentucky